The 1986 Asian Games was a multi-sport event celebrated in Seoul, South Korea from September 20 to October 5, 1986.

Medal table
The ranking in this table is consistent with International Olympic Committee convention in its published medal tables. By default, the table is ordered by the number of gold medals the athletes from a nation have won (in this context, a "nation" is an entity represented by a National Olympic Committee). The number of silver medals is taken into consideration next and then the number of bronze medals. If nations are still tied, equal ranking is given; they are listed alphabetically by IOC country code.

References

External links
Final medal table

Medal table
1986